Dighton Corson (October 21, 1827May 7, 1915) was an American lawyer, politician, and jurist, and was a pioneer of Wisconsin and South Dakota.  He was one of first justices of the South Dakota Supreme Court.

Biography
On October 21, 1827,  Dighton was born to Isaac and Nancy Corson in Canaan, Maine. He studied law and was admitted to the bar in 1853.

He would live in Milwaukee, Wisconsin, and Virginia City, Nevada, before eventually moving to South Dakota. Corson married Elizabeth Hoffman on May 22, 1882. On May 7, 1915, he died at his home in Pierre, South Dakota. Corson County, South Dakota is named for him.

On May 31, 1861, D. Corson and family left New York City aboard the steamship North Star. On December 13, 1861, he was appointed as the first District Attorney for the First Judicial District of Nevada Territory.

Career
Corson was a member of the Wisconsin State Assembly from 1857 to 1858. In 1859, he was District Attorney of Milwaukee County, Wisconsin. He was a delegate to the South Dakota State Constitutional Convention in 1885 and 1889 and would serve as a justice of the South Dakota Supreme Court from 1889 to 1913.

References

|-

People from Somerset County, Maine
Politicians from Milwaukee
People from Virginia City, Nevada
Members of the Wisconsin State Assembly
Justices of the South Dakota Supreme Court
Wisconsin lawyers
1827 births
1915 deaths
Corson County, South Dakota
Lawyers from Milwaukee
19th-century American judges
19th-century American lawyers